Jane Claxton (born 26 October 1992) is an Australian field hockey player for Australia. Claxton was a member of the Australia women's national field hockey team that were defeated by the Netherlands women's national field hockey team in the final of the 2014 Women's Hockey World Cup, a Gold Medal winner at the 2014 Commonwealth Games and member of the team that went to the 2016 Summer Olympics. She was also named captain of the Hockeyroos in November 2016 for the Tans-Tasman Trophy against New Zealand.

Playing career

Club hockey
Claxton played club hockey in Adelaide for the Burnside Bulldogs. Whilst living in Perth, she plays for Victoria Park Xavier Panthers (VPX) Premier League Women's competition, but wishes that she plays for Wesley South Perth (WASP's), as they beat Victoria Park Panthers last year in the Grand Final. But WASP's didn't even make the final in 2020 when Victoria Park won.

State hockey
Claxton played state representative hockey for South Australia in Under 12 (SAPSASA), Under 13, Under 15, Under 16(Secondary Schools), Under 18 and Under 21. In 2012, Claxton was Player of the Tournament at the U21 Women's National Hockey Championships where South Australia finished 2nd.

She has played eight years (2009–2016) in the Australian Hockey League including two years as Captain in 2015 and 2016.

In 2011, Claxton was a member of the Australian Hockey League team the SA Suns that won the national championship. She was Player of the Tournament at the 2015 Australian Hockey League held in Sydney.

International hockey
Claxton has played over 100 international games for the Hockeyroos, including the Commonwealth Games, Olympic Games and World Cup.

Her tournaments include:
2013 – World League Semi-final (London, England) – 1st
2013 – Women's Hockey Junior World Cup (Mönchengladbach, Germany) – 6th
2013 – Oceania Cup (Stratford, New Zealand) – 1st
2013 – World League Finals (Tucuman, Argentina) – 2nd
2014 – Women's Hockey World Cup (The Hague, Netherlands) –  2nd
2014 – Commonwealth Games (Glasgow, Scotland) – 1st
2015 – World League Semi-final (Antwerp, Belgium) – 3rd
2015 – Oceania Cup (Stratford, New Zealand) – 1st
2015 – World League Finals (Rosario, Argentina) – 6th 
2016 – Champions Trophy (London, Great Britain) – 4th
2016 – Rio Summer Olympics – quarter finals

Claxton captained the Hockeyroos in November 2016 for the Trans-Tasman Trophy against New Zealand.

Claxton qualified for the Tokyo 2020 Olympics. She was part of the Hockeyroos Olympics squad. The Hockeyroos lost 1-0 to India in the quarterfinals and therefore were not in medal contention.

International goals

Personal life
Claxton lives in Perth, Western Australia, as part of the national training program, having grown up in Adelaide, South Australia. Claxton's older brother, Matthew Claxton, also plays hockey, and has represented South Australia in the Australian Hockey League team the Southern Hotshots and was the Hockey SA Premier League Best and Fairest in 2014.

She represented South Australia in cross country and athletics, competed in district netball, tennis and swimming before settling into hockey as her sport of choice.

Recognition and awards
2012 – Player of the Tournament – U21 Women's National Hockey Championships
2013 – South Australian Sports Institute Junior Female Athlete of the Year 2013
2015 – Australian Hockey League Player of the Tournament

References

External links
 
 
 

Living people
1992 births
Australian female field hockey players
Field hockey players from Adelaide
Sportswomen from South Australia
Field hockey players at the 2014 Commonwealth Games
Field hockey players at the 2016 Summer Olympics
Olympic field hockey players of Australia
Commonwealth Games medallists in field hockey
Commonwealth Games gold medallists for Australia
Field hockey players at the 2020 Summer Olympics
Medallists at the 2014 Commonwealth Games